Kalpnath Sonkar was an Indian politician. He was elected to the Lok Sabha from Basti twice, in 1980 from Congress party and again in 1989 from Janata Dal.

Early life 
Sonkar was a fruit seller before joining politics. He was the father of Ravi Kumar Sonkar. He was the General Secretary of All India Rashtriya Sanjay Manch, 1982 to 1985.

References 

Lok Sabha members from Uttar Pradesh
People from Basti
Indian National Congress politicians from Uttar Pradesh